Parker Retzlaff (born May 21, 2003)  is an American professional stock car racing driver. He competes full-time in the NASCAR Xfinity Series, driving the No. 31 Chevrolet Camaro for Jordan Anderson Racing.

Racing career

Early career

In 2012, at nine years old, Retzlaff competed in the Wisconsin Junior Sprints, where he won the mid-season championship. He competed in the Wisconsin Bandolero Series in 2013, finishing 3rd in points, and winning the championship a year later. He would rank 2nd in state points from 2015 to 2016. 

He ran full-time in the ARCA Midwest Tour in 2017, where he ranked 14th in points and ranking 2nd in the Midwest Truck Series asphalt trucks. And for 2018, he finished sixth in the overall standings of the Midwest Truck Series.

ARCA Menards Series East
Retzlaff would sign with Visconti Motorsports for two races in the 2019 NASCAR K&N Pro Series East (now ARCA Menards Series East, driving the No. 74. He would finish 10th at Memphis International Raceway, for his first-ever top 10, and would finish 5th at Gateway Motorsports Park, scoring his first-ever top 5.

In 2020, Retzlaff would sign with Cook-Finley Racing full-time, driving in the No. 42. He earned 5 top 10s, and one top 20, finishing 4th in the standings.

He would return to Cook-Finley Racing in 2021 but only ran for a partial schedule. He would finish 4th at the Southern National Motorsports Park, making it his best career ARCA Menards Series East finish.

NASCAR K&N Pro Series West
Retzlaff made his 2019 NASCAR K&N Pro Series West debut, running the race's paired event with the NASCAR K&N Pro Series East, at Gateway Motorsports Park. He finished in 5th.

ARCA Menards Series
Retzlaff made his ARCA Menards Series debut in 2020 for Cook-Finley Racing, driving in paired events with the East series. His best finish of the season was 8th at Toledo Speedway. He returned in 2021, driving in the paired East series race at the Milwaukee Mile. He would finish 11th.

NASCAR Xfinity Series

2022
On December 3, 2021, Retzlaff would sign with RSS Racing for a part-time effort in the 2022 NASCAR Xfinity Series, driving the No. 38. He hopes to have a full-time program in 2023. At the 2022 United Rentals 200, his first start, Retzlaff would qualify an impressive 6th. He quickly fell back after the first restart. A fuel pump issue would end Retzlaff's race on lap 158, finishing 36th. He would score his best career finish at the 2022 ToyotaCare 250, after starting and finishing the race in 10th. On September 15, 2022, it was revealed that Retzlaff and RSS Racing had mutually parted ways. On September 20, it was announced that Retzlaff would drive the No. 02 for Our Motorsports at the Texas fall race.

2023
On January 4, 2023, Jordan Anderson Racing announced that Retzlaff will drive their No. 31 car full-time for the 2023 season. In the season-opener race at Daytona, Retzlaff earned a career-best 4th place finish.

NASCAR Camping World Truck Series
On September 26, 2022, it was revealed that Retzlaff would make his NASCAR Camping World Truck Series debut at Talladega Superspeedway, driving the No. 20 for Young's Motorsports.

Personal life
Retzlaff currently resides in his hometown of Rhinelander, Wisconsin. He is a fan of NASCAR Cup Series driver, Kyle Larson, and enjoys playing basketball, working on race cars, and playing on his iRacing sim during his free time.

Motorsports career results

Stock car career summary

† As Retzlaff was a guest driver, he was ineligible for championship points.

NASCAR
(key) (Bold – Pole position awarded by qualifying time. Italics – Pole position earned by points standings or practice time. * – Most laps led.)

Xfinity Series

Camping World Truck Series

 Season still in progress
 Ineligible for series points

K&N Pro Series West

ARCA Menards Series
(key) (Bold – Pole position awarded by qualifying time. Italics – Pole position earned by points standings or practice time. * – Most laps led.)

ARCA Menards Series East

Images

References

External links
 
 

2003 births
Living people
ARCA Menards Series drivers
NASCAR drivers
Racing drivers from Wisconsin
People from Rhinelander, Wisconsin